The 1916 United States Senate election in California was held on November 6, 1916. Incumbent Senator John Downey Works did not run for re-election.

Governor of California and 1912 Progressive Party vice presidential nominee Hiram Johnson won the open seat, defeating Democratic attorney and Mayor of San Marino George Patton.

Primaries

Republican primary

Candidates
Willis H. Booth, banker and philanthropist
Hiram Johnson, Governor of California

Results

Democratic primary

Candidates
 George S. Patton, Mayor of San Marino

Results
George Patton was unopposed on the ballot, but Hiram Johnson, Willis Booth, and Walter Thomas Mills received write-in votes.

Progressive primary

Candidates
Hiram Johnson, Governor of California

Results
Gov. Hiram Johnson was unopposed on the primary ballot, but Willis Booth did receive write-in votes.

Socialist primary

Candidates
Walter Thomas Mills

Results
Walter Thomas Mills was unopposed on the primary ballot, but Hiram Johnson and Willis Booth received write-in votes.

Prohibition primary

Candidates
Marshall W. Atwood, perennial candidate

Results
Atwood was unopposed on the primary ballot, but Hiram Johnson and Willis Booth received write-in votes.

General election

Results

See also 
  1916 United States Senate elections

References 

1916 California elections
California
1916